Yannis Tsirimokos (1916–1979) was a Greek left-wing journalist, better known under the name Yannis Maris (Γιάννης Μαρής) as a writer of detective fiction. From 1953, Maris wrote over forty short and well plotted novels that at the time were looked down on in Greece as pulp fiction, but have in later years come to be regarded as classics of the crime genre. Many of the novels feature Inspector Bekas (Αστυνόμος Μπέκας), the title figure of a contemporary Greek TV series. Maris was noted for the humorous and coded names of his books' characters.

Selected works
The Man on the Train (1958)

Film adaptations
A Matter of Life and Death (Zitima Zois kai Thanatou, Vagelis Serdaris (1972).

References

1916 births
1979 deaths
Greek mystery writers
Greek crime fiction writers